The 916th Aircraft Control and Warning Squadron is an inactive United States Air Force unit. It was last assigned to the Grand Forks Air Defense Sector, Air Defense Command, stationed at Beausejour Air Station, Manitoba, Canada. It was inactivated on 1 April 1963.

The unit was a General Surveillance Radar squadron providing for the air defense of North America.

Lineage
 Constituted as the 916th Aircraft Control and Warning Squadron
 Activated on 12 February 1952
 Discontinued and inactivated on 1 October 1961

Assignments
 32d Air Division, 12 February 1952
 31st Air Division, 1 December 1952
 29th Air Division, 1 January 1959
 Grand Forks Air Defense Sector, 1 April 1959 – 1 October 1961

Stations
 Grenier AFB, New Hampshire, 12 February 1952
 Beausejour AS, Manitoba, 1 December 1952 – 1 October 1961

References

 Cornett, Lloyd H. and Johnson, Mildred W., A Handbook of Aerospace Defense Organization  1946 - 1980,  Office of History, Aerospace Defense Center, Peterson AFB, CO (1980).

External links

Radar squadrons of the United States Air Force
Aerospace Defense Command units